Bledjon Guga (born 20 February 1986) is an Albanian football player who plays as a centre-back.

Club career
The central defender moved abroad to play for newly promoted side Balzan Youths in the Maltese Premier League.

Honours

Flamurtari 
 Kupa e shqipërisë (1): 2008–09
 Kupa Birra Norga (1): 2007
 Kupa Pavarësia (1): 2009
 Kupa Mbarëkombëtare (1): 2009

External links

1986 births
Living people
People from Himara
Association football central defenders
Albanian footballers
Flamurtari Vlorë players
FK Dinamo Tirana players
KF Vlora players
Balzan F.C. players
Dingli Swallows F.C. players
Ħamrun Spartans F.C. players
KF Himara players
KF Bylis Ballsh players
Albanian expatriate footballers
Expatriate footballers in Malta
Albanian expatriate sportspeople in Malta